Stress testing or stress test is a form of deliberately intense or thorough testing.

It may also refer to:

Techniques
Stress analysis, methods for computing mechanical stress
Trier social stress test, a procedure used to induce stress in human research participants
Voice stress analysis, sometimes called a voice stress test

Works
Stress Test (book), a book by former United States Secretary of the Treasury Timothy Geithner
"Stress Test", a 1990 episode of The Raccoons